An Dương Vương was the king and the only ruler of the kingdom of Âu Lạc, a classical antiquity state centered in the Red River Delta. As the leader of the Âu Việt tribes, he defeated the last Hùng king of the state of Văn Lang and united its people – known as the Lạc Việt – with his people, the Âu Việt. An Dương Vương fled and committed suicide after the war with Nanyue forces in 179 BCE.

Biography

Origin and foundation of Âu Lạc
It seems that King An Dương was an actual historical figure. Written accounts associated him with the Ancient Kingdom of Shu, conquered by King Huiwen of Qin in 316 BCE. However, there are some problems inherent in accepting this traditional view. Many chronicles including Records of the Outer Territories of the Jiao province, Đại Việt sử lược, Đại Việt sử ký toàn thư stated that he was Shu prince (ms. "蜀王子", literal meaning: "son of the Shu king"), but they were unable to describe precisely his origin. Later historians had a more nuanced view. In Khâm định Việt sử Thông giám cương mục, the writers expressed doubts about An Dương Vương's origin, claiming it was impossible for a Shu prince to cross thousands of miles, through forests, many kingdoms to invade Văn Lang.

In 1963, an oral tradition of Tày people in Cao Bằng titled  "Nine Lords Vying for Kingship" was recorded. According to this account, at the end of Hồng Bàng dynasty, there was a kingdom called Nam Cương (lit. "southern border") in modern-day Cao Bằng and Guangxi. This was a confederation of 10 mường, in which the King resided in the central one (present-day Cao Bằng Province).The other nine regions were under the control of nine lords. While King An Dương's father died, he was still a child; yet, his intelligence enabled him to retain the throne and all the lords surrendered. Nam Cương became more and more powerful while Văn Lang became weak. Subsequently, he invaded Văn Lang and founded the state of Âu Lạc in approximately 257 BCE, proclaiming himself King An Dương (An Dương Vương).

Construction of Cổ Loa Citadel

Historical accounts claim, after purportedly taking power, Kinh An Dương ordered to construct a fortified settlement in Tây Vu known to history as Cổ Loa as his seat of power. It looked like a snail shell design (its name, Cổ Loa 古螺, means "old snail": according to Đại Việt Sử Ký Toàn Thư, the citadel is shaped like a snail).
 
The events associated with the construction of this spiral-shaped citadel are remembered in the legend of the golden turtle. According to this legend, when the citadel was being built, all the work done was mysteriously undone by a group of spirits led by thousand-year-old white chicken seeking to avenge the son of the previous king. In response to the king's plea, a giant golden turtle suddenly emerged from the water, and protected the King until the citadel's completion. The turtle gave the King one of his claws before leaving and instructed him to make a crossbow using it as a trigger, assuring him he would be invincible with it. A man called Cao Lỗ (or Cao Thông) was tasked to create that crossbow. It was then called "Saintly Crossbow of the Supernaturally Luminous Golden Claw" (靈光金爪神弩; SV: Linh Quang Kim Trảo Thần Nỏ); one shot could kill 300 men.

War with Nanyue
In 204 BCE, in Panyu (now Guangzhou), Zhao Tuo established the kingdom of Nanyue. Taylor (1983) believed that when Nanyue and Âu Lạc co-existed, Âu Lạc temporarily acknowledged Nanyue to show their mutual anti-Han sentiment, and this did not imply that Nanyue exerted any real authority over Âu Lạc. Nanyue's influence over Âu Lạc waned after relationship with Han dynasty become normal. The army Zhao Tuo had created to oppose the Han was now available to deploy against the Âu Lạc.
 
Details of the campaign are not authentically recorded. Zhao Tuo's early setbacks and eventual victory against King An Dương were mentioned in Record of the Outer Territory of Jiao Region (交州外域記) and Records of the Taikang Era of the Jin (晉太康記). Records of the Grand Historian mentioned neither King An Duong nor Zhao Tuo's military conquest of Âu Lạc only that after Empress Lü's death (180 BCE), Zhao Tuo used his troops to menace and his wealth to bribe the Minyue, the Western Ou, and the Luo into submission. However, the campaign inspired a legend whose theme is the transfer of the turtle claw-triggered crossbow from King An Duong to Zhao Tuo. According to the myth, ownership of the crossbow conferred political power: "He who is able to hold this crossbow rules the realm; he who is not able to hold this crossbow will perish."
 
Unsuccessful on the battlefield, Zhao Tuo asked for a truce and sent his son Zhong Shi to submit to King An Dương and serve him. There, he and King An Duong's daughter, Mỵ Châu, fell in love and were married. A vestige of the matrilocal organization required the husband to live in the residence of his wife's family. As a result, they resided at An Duong's court until Zhong Shi discovered the secrets and strategies of King An Dương. Meanwhile, King An Duong mistreated Cao Lỗ, and he left.
 
Zhong Shi had Mỵ Châu showed him the crossbow, at which point he secretly changed its trigger, neutralizing its special powers and rendering it useless. He then asked to return to his father, who thereupon launched a new attack on Âu Lạc and this time defeated King An Dương. History records that, with his defeat, the King was told by the turtle about his daughter's betrayal and killed his daughter for her treachery before going into the watery realm.

Legacy
Vietnamese historians typically view the main events of this era as having roots in historical fact. However interpretation and reconciliation of the history of the period has been set in, and sometimes against, the history of Soviet interpretation of history. The capital of King An Dương, Cổ Loa, was the first political center of the Vietnamese civilization pre-Sinitic era. The site consists of two outer sets of ramparts and a citadel on the inside, of rectangular shape. The moats consist of a series of streams, including the Hoang Giang River and a network of lakes that provided Cổ Loa with protection and navigation. Kim estimated the population of Cổ Loa possibly ranged from 5,000 to around 10,000 inhabitants.

In popular culture 
 The British video game Stronghold : Warlords.

See also

 Đông Sơn culture
 History of Vietnam
 Hồng Bàng dynasty
 Lạc Việt
 Âu Việt
 Nam Việt
 Triệu dynasty
 Triệu Đà
 Phiên Ngung
 Trọng Thuỷ
 Âu Lạc
 Cổ Loa Citadel
 Tây Vu Vương
 Bách Việt

Notes

Citations

Early

Modern

Bibliography

Early

Modern

External links
  An Duong Vuong Dynasty

179 BC deaths
3rd-century BC rulers in Asia
3rd century BC in Vietnam
3rd-century BC rulers
Ancient Vietnam
Vietnamese generals
Vietnamese kings
Vietnamese dynasties
Year of birth unknown
People from Shu (state)
Founding monarchs
City founders